CITYPlus FM is a Chinese business radio station catered for primary Chinese-speaking PMEBs (Professionals, Managers, Executives and Businessmen) and SMEs in Malaysia. It is owned by Ooga X Sdn Bhd. The radio started its trial transmission in Kuching since 24 April 2016 on FM 92.5 MHz. Another trial transmission was aired in Klang Valley on FM 106.0 MHz by launching a transmitter in Gunung Telapak Buruk. On 2 May 2017, the radio was officially launched in the areas, meanwhile Kuching FM 92.5 MHz was rebranded as the third radio station. Its frequency for Klang Valley was formerly carried by Red FM before June 2009.

The radio covers topics of international and local headlines, interviews with corporate personalities. It also covers topics of corporate, health, automotive and property sector. During non-DJ hours (midnights), Chinese independent music from Taiwan, Malaysia, Singapore, Hong Kong and China, and also English or Japanese will get its airtime.

In April 2020, CITYPlus FM ceased transmission in Kuching, Sarawak.

References

External links 
 

2017 establishments in Malaysia
Radio stations established in 2017
Radio stations in Malaysia
Chinese-language radio stations in Malaysia